Harjit is a Punjabi name and may refer to

Harjit Harman, Indian singer
Harjit Sajjan, Canadian politician
Harjit Singh Anand, Indian official
 Harjit Singh Bedi, Indian judge

Indian masculine given names